Datua is a genus of planthoppers containing the single species Datua bisinuata and placed in the tribe Laternariini.  The species is found in Borneo and Sumatra.

References

External links 
 
 Image at iNaturalist

Auchenorrhyncha genera
Hemiptera of Asia
Fulgorinae
Monotypic Hemiptera genera